Party of the Sun is a political party in Santa Ana, Costa Rica. The party was founded on February 17, 1997. The president is Patricia Segovia Pinto and the party secretary Gastón Vargas Rojas.

References

Political parties in Costa Rica
Local government in Costa Rica